The 2013 Bendigo Women's International (2) was a professional tennis tournament played on outdoor hard courts. It was the sixth edition of the tournament (second of the year) which was part of the 2013 ITF Women's Circuit, offering a total of $50,000 in prize money. It took place in Bendigo, Australia, on 28 October–3 November 2013. Rodionova, Barty and Peers were listed as the defending champions as they were the champions of the event last year, as there were two events in 2013 they are listed as defending champions for both editions.

WTA entrants

Seeds 

 1 Rankings as of 21 October 2013

Other entrants 
The following players received wildcards into the singles main draw:
  Zoe Hives
  Nicole Hoynaski
  Ashley Keir
  Karolina Wlodarczak

The following players received entry from the qualifying draw:
  Naiktha Bains
  Emma Hayman
  Karis Ryan
  Varunya Wongteanchai

Champions

Singles 

  Casey Dellacqua def.  Tammi Patterson 6–3, 6–1

Doubles 

  Monique Adamczak /  Olivia Rogowska def.  Stephanie Bengson /  Sally Peers 6–3, 2–6, [11–9]

External links 
 2013 Bendigo Women's International (2) at ITFtennis.com
 Tennis Australia official website

2013 ITF Women's Circuit
Bendigo Women's International
2013 in Australian tennis
2013 in Australian women's sport